Boštetje is a small settlement on the Rute Plateau in the hills west of Velike Lašče in Slovenia. The area is included in the Central Slovenia Statistical Region. Traditionally it was part of Lower Carniola.

References

External links

Boštetje on Geopedia

Populated places in the Municipality of Velike Lašče